Anastatus disparis is a species of egg parasitoid. Hosts include Lymantria dispar and Antheraea pernyi. The species is sexually dimorphic, with 630 sex specific genes.  Females have 11 antennal subsegments, whereas males have 8. Females only mate once, and males are significantly shorter lived than females, engaging in agonistic behavior.

References

Eupelmidae
Biological pest control wasps